Kiefferia pericarpiicola  is a species of fly in the family Cecidomyiidae. It is found in the  Palearctic.  The larvae gall on Apiaceae.

References

External links
 Plant Parasites of Europe
 Images representing  Cecidomyiidae at BOLD
 

Cecidomyiidae
Diptera of Europe
Gall-inducing insects
Insects described in 1847
Nematoceran flies of Europe
Taxa named by Johann Jacob Bremi-Wolf